The Ibero-American Model Forest Network (RIABM) is the regional network representing the 29 Model Forests across the Caribbean, Latin American and Spain.

History 
During the United Nations Conference on Environment and Development in Rio de Janeiro in 1992, countries agreed that there was an urgent need to find real, practical and sustainable solutions to the great environmental challenges that our planet faced. At this time, Canada invited the rest of the world to put into practice the Model Forest approach and created the IMFN to facilitate the exchange of knowledge and experiences.

The IMFN provides Model Forests in partner countries access to certain opportunities such as the exchange of experiences and the promotion of good governance. This, in turn, increases regional knowledge and the development of strategic initiatives. In addition, the network strengthens the link between regional and global forest policy initiatives and provides an avenue for international donors to fund conservation projects in each country.

About RIABM 
The Ibero-American Model Forest Network (RIABM) aims to be a regional benchmark for the sustainable management of forest-based landscapes. It promotes cooperation among Model Forests, institutions and member countries based on knowledge exchange and innovative experiences, and contributes to public policies related to the sustainable management of natural resources.

It is the first voluntary regional organization to be created that brings together 15 countries and 29 Model Forests in Central and South America, the Caribbean and Spain to share knowledge and experiences. The RIABM promotes the sustainable management of forest-based landscapes and connects Model Forests of member countries.

Strategic objectives 
The strategic objectives of the RIABM are:

 To consolidate the Model Forest, promote regional Model Forest network expansion and facilitate horizontal collaboration among sites.
 To strengthen the RIABM’s capacity to provide support to its members and to achieve its financial sustainability.
 To share knowledge and transfer technology through technical horizontal collaboration, dissemination of information on best practices and other relates activities.
 To contribute to sectoral and multisectoral processes of public policies formulation, implementation and evaluation related with the sustainable management of forest-based landscapes.

Governance Platforms 
Model Forests are in essence governance platforms. They function as territorial management systems that are inclusive to all stakeholders in a community. Each Model Forest has the liberty to define how it will function, as long as it adheres to the Principles and Attributes agreed to by all Model Forests;

Principle 1.  Broad-base Partnership

Principle 2.  Large Landscape

Principle 3. Commitment to Sustainability

Principle 4.  Participatory Governance

Principle 5. A Broad Program of Activities

Principle 6. Commitment to Knowledge Sharing, Capacity Building and Networking

Their multilateral approach to governance distinguishes Model Forests from both top-down and bottom-up approaches. The desire to remain neutral and independent has allowed Model Forests to connect with all stakeholders. One of the rising trends within this model is their focus on forging alliances at multiple levels. Currently, there are 6 regional Model Forest network around the globe, all of which are members of the International Model Forest Network. Each of these regional networks facilitates the communication between local groups with members across the region and even across the globe. By hosting board meetings, capacity development workshops and overseeing project interventions, these networks are facilitating the development of cohesive and sustainable development projects.

Members

Model Forests

Partners 

RIABM relies on the collaboration of internationally recognized organizations such as the Tropical Agricultural Research and Higher Education Center (CATIE), the Food and Agriculture Organization of the United Nations (FAO) and Cuso International, the Network partners with countries that support the Model Forest approach to sustainable development.

The RIABM is one of the six regional networks of the International Model Forest Network (IMFN) along with the Mediterranean Model Forest Network, the African Model Forest Network, the Regional Model Forest Network - Asia, the Baltic Landscape Initiative (Sweden, Russia and Northern European countries) and the Canadian Model Forest Network. Since the founding of the RIABM in 2002, it has evolved to become one of the largest and most dynamic regional networks within the IMFN. The IMFN is a global community of practice that links over 60 Model Forests in 30 countries across five continents around the world.

References

Forestry in Spain
Forestry in South America
Forestry in Central America
Forest conservation organizations